Ayumi Macías (born 1 January 1997) is a Mexican swimmer. She competed in the women's 800 metre freestyle event at the 2017 World Aquatics Championships.

References

1997 births
Living people
Mexican female swimmers
Place of birth missing (living people)
Mexican female freestyle swimmers
21st-century Mexican women